Rachid Badouri (born October 16, 1976 in Laval, Quebec) is a Canadian comedian.

Biography 
Badouri was born to immigrants of Moroccan Berber origin. He studied at College Montmorency in Laval, Quebec where he had his first experience on stage. In 1999, he had a major appearance at Just for Laughs (Juste pour rire) festival in Montreal with a presentation about immigration. He also appeared in a number of comedic advertisements in Quebec media (television, radio, print media).

In October 2007, he launched his first one-man show entitled Arrête ton cinéma! .

Awards
 1999: Craven A award joined with École Nationale de l'Humour and third place in Just For Laughs gala
 2005: Revelation of the Year at Just for Laughs festival
 2006: Discovery of the Year at the Oliviers gala
 2008: Performance of the Year at the Oliviers gala
 2009: Double platinum for number of tickets sold in 18 months in Quebec (above 100,000 tickets)

References

External links
 Rachid Badouri site
 Just for Laughs Rachid Badouri site

1976 births
Canadian stand-up comedians
Canadian people of Moroccan descent
Comedians from Quebec
Living people
People from Laval, Quebec